The EHF Players of the Year are handball awards given annually to the best male and female players who are considered to have performed the best in the previous year. They are awarded based on the EHF Players of the Month list of winners.

Men

Women

See also 
 IHF World Player of the Year

References

 
 
 
European Handball Federation
Handball trophies and awards
Awards established in 2017